Madame et son flirt is a 1946 French film starring Giselle Pascal.

It recorded admissions in France of 1,659,306.

References

External links
Madamde et son flirt at IMDb

1946 films
French black-and-white films
1940s French-language films
French romantic comedy films
1946 romantic comedy films
1940s French films